Physaria is a genus of flowering plants in the family Brassicaceae. Many species are known generally as twinpods, bladderpods, or lesquerella. They are native to the Americas, with many species endemic to western North America. They are densely hairy annual and perennial herbs often growing prostrate or decumbent, along the ground in patches or clumps. They bear inflorescences of bright yellow flowers. The fruit is often notched deeply, dividing into twin sections, giving the genus its common name.

Bladderpod oil is extracted from the seeds of Physaria fendleri and certain other species in the genus.

Due to the presence of both annual and perennial herbaceous members, this genus has been used as a model for allocation pattern comparisons between the annual and perennial life cycle.

Many of species of Physaria were formerly included in the now-defunct genus Lesquerella.

Species include:
Physaria acutifolia—Sharpleaf twinpod
Physaria alpestris—Washington twinpod
Physaria alpina—Avery Peak twinpod
Physaria arctica—Arctic bladderpod
Physaria argyraea—Silver bladderpod
Physaria bellii—Front Range twinpod
Physaria brassicoides—Double twinpod
Physaria chambersii—Chambers' twinpod
Physaria condensata—Tufted twinpod
Physaria congesta —Dudley Bluffs bladderpod
Physaria didymocarpa—Common twinpod
Physaria fendleri—Fendler's bladderpod
Physaria filiformis—Missouri bladderpod
Physaria floribunda—Pointtip twinpod
Physaria fremontii—Fremont's bladderpod
Physaria geyeri—Geyer's twinpod
Physaria globosa—Globe bladderpod
Physaria gordonii—Gordon's bladderpod
Physaria grahamii—Graham's twinpod
Physaria hemiphysaria—Intermountain bladderpod
Physaria humilis—St. Marys Peak Bladderpod 
Physaria integrifolia—Bladderpod 
Physaria kingii—King bladderpod
Physaria lepidota—Kane County twinpod
Physaria ludoviciana—Foothill Bladderpod.
Physaria navajoensis —Navajo twinpod
Physaria obcordata—Dudley Bluffs twinpod (threatened)
Physaria occidentalis—Western bladderpod
Physaria okanensis—O'Kane's bladderpod
Physaria oregona—Oregon twinpod
Physaria pallida—White bladderpod
Physaria parviflora—Piceance bladderpod
Physaria parvula—Pygmy bladderpod
Physaria pruinosa—Pagosa bladderpod
Physaria purpurea—Rose bladderpod
Physaria reediana—Alpine bladderpod
Physaria repanda—Indian Canyon twinpod
Physaria saximontana—Fremont County twinpod
Physaria tenella—Moapa bladderpod
Physaria thamnophila—Zapata bladderpod
Physaria tumulosa—Kodachrome bladderpod
Physaria vitulifera—Roundtip twinpod

References

External links
Jepson Manual Treatment: Physaria
USDA Plants Profile
CONPS: Physaria of Colorado

 
Brassicaceae genera
Flora of North America
Taxa named by Asa Gray